Chlorochaeta integranota is a moth of the family Geometridae first described by George Hampson in 1893. It is found in Sri Lanka and South India.

The antenna of the male are bipectinate (comb like on both sides) and the female are filiform (thread like). The apex of the forewing is blunt and of the hindwing is round. Wings green. Hindwing usually with postmedial line absent. White to brown blotches found.

References

Moths of Asia
Moths described in 1893